The Braille pattern dots-135 is a 6-dot braille cell with the top and bottom left, and middle right dots raised, or an 8-dot braille cell with the top and lower-middle left, and upper-middle right dots raised. It is represented by the Unicode code point U+2815, and in Braille ASCII with the letter "O".

Unified Braille

In unified international braille, the braille pattern dots-135 is used to represent close-mid to open-mid back rounded vowels, such as /o/, /o̞/, or /ɔ/.

Table of unified braille values

Other braille

Plus dots 7 and 8

Related to Braille pattern dots-135 are Braille patterns 1357, 1358, and 13578, which are used in 8-dot braille systems, such as Gardner-Salinas and Luxembourgish Braille.

Related 8-dot kantenji patterns

In the Japanese kantenji braille, the standard 8-dot Braille patterns 267, 1267, 2467, and 12467 are the patterns related to Braille pattern dots-135, since the two additional dots of kantenji patterns 0135, 1357, and 01357 are placed above the base 6-dot cell, instead of below, as in standard 8-dot braille.

Kantenji using braille patterns 267, 1267, 2467, or 12467

This listing includes kantenji using Braille pattern dots-135 for all 6349 kanji found in JIS C 6226-1978.

  - ⽥

Variants and thematic compounds

  -  た/⽥ + selector 1  =  谷
  -  た/⽥ + selector 4  =  由
  -  た/⽥ + selector 5  =  曲
  -  比 + た/⽥  =  尺

Compounds of ⽥

  -  ぬ/力 + た/⽥  =  勇
  -  に/氵 + ぬ/力 + た/⽥  =  湧
  -  み/耳 + ぬ/力 + た/⽥  =  踴
  -  け/犬 + た/⽥  =  奮
  -  み/耳 + た/⽥  =  戴
  -  ふ/女 + た/⽥  =  画
  -  火 + た/⽥  =  畑
  -  ら/月 + た/⽥  =  留
  -  心 + ら/月 + た/⽥  =  榴
  -  に/氵 + ら/月 + た/⽥  =  溜
  -  へ/⺩ + ら/月 + た/⽥  =  瑠
  -  や/疒 + ら/月 + た/⽥  =  瘤
  -  ち/竹 + ら/月 + た/⽥  =  霤
  -  龸 + た/⽥  =  畜
  -  日 + た/⽥  =  畠
  -  つ/土 + た/⽥  =  畦
  -  の/禾 + た/⽥  =  番
  -  た/⽥ + む/車  =  翻
  -  の/禾 + た/⽥ + こ/子  =  糞
  -  し/巿 + の/禾 + た/⽥  =  幡
  -  て/扌 + の/禾 + た/⽥  =  播
  -  ほ/方 + の/禾 + た/⽥  =  旛
  -  に/氵 + の/禾 + た/⽥  =  潘
  -  火 + の/禾 + た/⽥  =  燔
  -  い/糹/#2 + の/禾 + た/⽥  =  繙
  -  ⺼ + の/禾 + た/⽥  =  膰
  -  く/艹 + の/禾 + た/⽥  =  蕃
  -  む/車 + の/禾 + た/⽥  =  蟠
  -  か/金 + の/禾 + た/⽥  =  鐇
  -  た/⽥ + た/⽥ + む/車  =  飜
  -  い/糹/#2 + た/⽥  =  細
  -  い/糹/#2 + た/⽥ + ゐ/幺  =  縲
  -  く/艹 + た/⽥  =  蓄
  -  さ/阝 + た/⽥  =  隈
  -  ち/竹 + た/⽥  =  雷
  -  て/扌 + ち/竹 + た/⽥  =  擂
  -  く/艹 + ち/竹 + た/⽥  =  蕾
  -  め/目 + た/⽥  =  鼻
  -  れ/口 + め/目 + た/⽥  =  嚊
  -  ふ/女 + め/目 + た/⽥  =  嬶
  -  か/金 + め/目 + た/⽥  =  鼾
  -  た/⽥ + な/亻  =  佃
  -  た/⽥ + つ/土  =  塁
  -  た/⽥ + 心  =  思
  -  ⺼ + た/⽥ + 心  =  腮
  -  お/頁 + た/⽥ + 心  =  顋
  -  せ/食 + た/⽥ + 心  =  鰓
  -  た/⽥ + き/木  =  果
  -  え/訁 + た/⽥  =  課
  -  た/⽥ + ほ/方  =  夥
  -  ね/示 + た/⽥ + き/木  =  裹
  -  み/耳 + た/⽥ + き/木  =  踝
  -  お/頁 + た/⽥ + き/木  =  顆
  -  た/⽥ + 比  =  毘
  -  た/⽥ + ぬ/力  =  男
  -  ふ/女 + た/⽥ + ぬ/力  =  嫐
  -  せ/食 + た/⽥ + ぬ/力  =  甥
  -  ぬ/力 + た/⽥ + ぬ/力  =  舅
  -  た/⽥ + 宿 + ふ/女  =  嬲
  -  た/⽥ + て/扌  =  町
  -  た/⽥ + 宿  =  界
  -  つ/土 + た/⽥ + 宿  =  堺
  -  た/⽥ + ね/示  =  畏
  -  た/⽥ + け/犬  =  猥
  -  た/⽥ + ね/示 + selector 1  =  畩
  -  た/⽥ + す/発  =  畝
  -  た/⽥ + か/金  =  畢
  -  み/耳 + た/⽥ + か/金  =  蹕
  -  た/⽥ + れ/口  =  略
  -  た/⽥ + た/⽥ + れ/口  =  畧
  -  た/⽥ + こ/子  =  異
  -  き/木 + た/⽥ + こ/子  =  冀
  -  た/⽥ + そ/馬  =  畳
  -  た/⽥ + た/⽥ + そ/馬  =  疊
  -  た/⽥ + ゑ/訁  =  畷
  -  た/⽥ + ち/竹  =  笛
  -  た/⽥ + ゐ/幺  =  累
  -  や/疒 + た/⽥ + ゐ/幺  =  瘰
  -  む/車 + た/⽥ + ゐ/幺  =  螺
  -  そ/馬 + た/⽥ + ゐ/幺  =  騾
  -  た/⽥ + ⺼  =  胃
  -  す/発 + た/⽥  =  膚
  -  す/発 + 宿 + た/⽥  =  盧
  -  心 + た/⽥  =  蘆
  -  よ/广 + 宿 + た/⽥  =  廬
  -  心 + 龸 + た/⽥  =  櫨
  -  に/氵 + 龸 + た/⽥  =  瀘
  -  ⺼ + 宿 + た/⽥  =  臚
  -  ふ/女 + 宿 + た/⽥  =  艫
  -  む/車 + 宿 + た/⽥  =  轤
  -  そ/馬 + 宿 + た/⽥  =  驢
  -  せ/食 + 宿 + た/⽥  =  鱸
  -  れ/口 + た/⽥ + ⺼  =  喟
  -  に/氵 + た/⽥ + ⺼  =  渭
  -  む/車 + た/⽥ + ⺼  =  蝟
  -  た/⽥ + く/艹  =  苗
  -  た/⽥ + さ/阝  =  卑
  -  へ/⺩ + た/⽥  =  牌
  -  ま/石 + た/⽥  =  碑
  -  ⺼ + た/⽥  =  脾
  -  お/頁 + た/⽥  =  顰
  -  た/⽥ + せ/食  =  鵯
  -  な/亻 + た/⽥ + さ/阝  =  俾
  -  ふ/女 + た/⽥ + さ/阝  =  婢
  -  や/疒 + た/⽥ + さ/阝  =  痺
  -  め/目 + た/⽥ + さ/阝  =  睥
  -  心 + た/⽥ + さ/阝  =  稗
  -  ね/示 + た/⽥ + さ/阝  =  裨
  -  か/金 + た/⽥ + さ/阝  =  髀
  -  に/氵 + 宿 + た/⽥  =  沺
  -  氷/氵 + ら/月 + た/⽥  =  澑
  -  へ/⺩ + 宿 + た/⽥  =  璢
  -  も/門 + 宿 + た/⽥  =  甸
  -  た/⽥ + 数 + て/扌  =  甼
  -  た/⽥ + 宿 + す/発  =  畆
  -  た/⽥ + selector 3 + け/犬  =  畉
  -  た/⽥ + selector 5 + い/糹/#2  =  畊
  -  た/⽥ + 宿 + 氷/氵  =  畋
  -  た/⽥ + 仁/亻 + 宿  =  畍
  -  け/犬 + 宿 + た/⽥  =  畚
  -  た/⽥ + 宿 + う/宀/#3  =  畛
  -  た/⽥ + つ/土 + し/巿  =  畤
  -  た/⽥ + り/分 + も/門  =  畭
  -  た/⽥ + 宿 + へ/⺩  =  畴
  -  た/⽥ + け/犬 + か/金  =  畸
  -  た/⽥ + 宿 + そ/馬  =  疂
  -  た/⽥ + へ/⺩ + し/巿  =  疇
  -  ね/示 + 龸 + た/⽥  =  禝
  -  ち/竹 + 宿 + た/⽥  =  篳
  -  え/訁 + 宿 + た/⽥  =  謖
  -  か/金 + 龸 + た/⽥  =  鈿
  -  た/⽥ + 宿 + せ/食  =  鴫
  -  ら/月 + ら/月 + た/⽥  =  畄
  -  い/糹/#2 + ら/月 + た/⽥  =  緇
  -  む/車 + ら/月 + た/⽥  =  輜
  -  か/金 + ら/月 + た/⽥  =  錙
  -  せ/食 + ら/月 + た/⽥  =  鯔
  -  な/亻 + た/⽥ + た/⽥  =  儡
  -  た/⽥ + た/⽥ + つ/土  =  壘
  -  き/木 + た/⽥ + た/⽥  =  櫑
  -  ん/止 + た/⽥ + た/⽥  =  罍
  -  な/亻 + た/⽥ + た/⽥  =  儡
  -  た/⽥ + 比 + ⺼  =  疉
  -  ん/止 + た/⽥ + た/⽥  =  罍
  -  な/亻 + 宿 + た/⽥  =  僵
  -  ゆ/彳 + 宿 + た/⽥  =  彊
  -  心 + 宿 + た/⽥  =  橿
  -  ゆ/彳 + 龸 + た/⽥  =  疆
  -  ふ/女 + ふ/女 + た/⽥  =  畫
  -  ぬ/力 + ふ/女 + た/⽥  =  劃
  -  た/⽥ + た/⽥ + 日  =  晝

Compounds of 谷

  -  う/宀/#3 + た/⽥  =  容
  -  に/氵 + た/⽥  =  溶
  -  き/木 + う/宀/#3 + た/⽥  =  榕
  -  火 + う/宀/#3 + た/⽥  =  熔
  -  の/禾 + う/宀/#3 + た/⽥  =  穃
  -  心 + う/宀/#3 + た/⽥  =  蓉
  -  か/金 + う/宀/#3 + た/⽥  =  鎔
  -  な/亻 + た/⽥  =  俗
  -  氷/氵 + た/⽥  =  浴
  -  ね/示 + た/⽥  =  裕
  -  宿 + た/⽥  =  豁
  -  た/⽥ + ん/止  =  欲
  -  る/忄 + た/⽥ + ん/止  =  慾
  -  や/疒 + た/⽥ + selector 1  =  峪
  -  ま/石 + た/⽥ + selector 1  =  硲
  -  め/目 + た/⽥ + selector 1  =  谺
  -  ゐ/幺 + た/⽥ + selector 1  =  谿
  -  ひ/辶 + た/⽥ + selector 1  =  逧
  -  さ/阝 + た/⽥ + selector 1  =  郤
  -  つ/土 + た/⽥ + selector 1  =  壑
  -  さ/阝 + 宿 + た/⽥  =  卻

Compounds of 由

  -  と/戸 + た/⽥  =  届
  -  む/車 + た/⽥  =  軸
  -  た/⽥ + 氷/氵  =  油
  -  た/⽥ + ら/月  =  胄
  -  た/⽥ + 囗  =  冑
  -  や/疒 + た/⽥ + selector 4  =  岫
  -  は/辶 + た/⽥ + selector 4  =  廸
  -  心 + た/⽥ + selector 4  =  柚
  -  い/糹/#2 + た/⽥ + selector 4  =  紬
  -  ふ/女 + た/⽥ + selector 4  =  舳
  -  む/車 + た/⽥ + selector 4  =  蚰
  -  ひ/辶 + た/⽥ + selector 4  =  迪
  -  の/禾 + た/⽥ + selector 4  =  釉
  -  そ/馬 + た/⽥ + selector 4  =  騁
  -  み/耳 + 宿 + た/⽥  =  聘

Compounds of 曲

  -  た/⽥ + り/分  =  典
  -  き/木 + た/⽥ + り/分  =  椣
  -  ⺼ + た/⽥ + り/分  =  腆
  -  た/⽥ + と/戸  =  豊
  -  た/⽥ + し/巿  =  艶
  -  た/⽥ + た/⽥ + し/巿  =  艷
  -  た/⽥ + た/⽥ + と/戸  =  豐
  -  み/耳 + た/⽥ + と/戸  =  軆
  -  せ/食 + た/⽥ + と/戸  =  鱧
  -  せ/食 + 龸 + た/⽥  =  醴
  -  た/⽥ + ろ/十  =  農
  -  な/亻 + た/⽥ + ろ/十  =  儂
  -  ⺼ + た/⽥ + ろ/十  =  膿
  -  と/戸 + た/⽥ + selector 5  =  髷

Compounds of 尺

  -  て/扌 + た/⽥  =  択
  -  ゑ/訁 + た/⽥  =  訳
  -  た/⽥ + の/禾  =  釈
  -  そ/馬 + た/⽥  =  駅
  -  た/⽥ + 日  =  昼
  -  た/⽥ + に/氵  =  沢
  -  れ/口 + 比 + た/⽥  =  呎
  -  か/金 + 比 + た/⽥  =  鈬
  -  た/⽥ + れ/口 + は/辶  =  咫

Compounds of 𦍒

  -  ひ/辶 + 宿 + た/⽥  =  逹
  -  ひ/辶 + た/⽥  =  達
  -  て/扌 + ひ/辶 + た/⽥  =  撻
  -  火 + ひ/辶 + た/⽥  =  燵
  -  も/門 + ひ/辶 + た/⽥  =  闥
  -  と/戸 + ひ/辶 + た/⽥  =  韃
  -  ゐ/幺 + た/⽥  =  繹
  -  た/⽥ + た/⽥ + に/氵  =  澤
  -  た/⽥ + た/⽥ + の/禾  =  釋
  -  る/忄 + 宿 + た/⽥  =  懌
  -  て/扌 + て/扌 + た/⽥  =  擇
  -  ゑ/訁 + ゑ/訁 + た/⽥  =  譯
  -  か/金 + 宿 + た/⽥  =  鐸
  -  そ/馬 + そ/馬 + た/⽥  =  驛

Other compounds

  -  か/金 + た/⽥  =  拶
  -  き/木 + た/⽥  =  楼
  -  よ/广 + た/⽥  =  蛋
  -  た/⽥ + い/糹/#2  =  対
  -  せ/食 + た/⽥  =  鯛
  -  ち/竹 + た/⽥ + ち/竹  =  籥
  -  た/⽥ + た/⽥ + い/糹/#2  =  對
  -  と/戸 + と/戸 + た/⽥  =  屆
  -  て/扌 + 宿 + た/⽥  =  扣
  -  き/木 + 宿 + た/⽥  =  樽
  -  き/木 + き/木 + た/⽥  =  樓

Notes

Braille patterns